Augustine Sam Rolleston is a New Zealand former professional rugby league footballer who played in the 1960s.

Playing career

International honours
Rolleston represented New Zealand in 1969 against Australia.

References

Living people
New Zealand national rugby league team players
New Zealand rugby league players
Place of birth missing (living people)
Rugby league centres
Wellington rugby league team players
Year of birth missing (living people)